Mother Mary Clare Millea was the superior general of the Catholic Apostles of the Sacred Heart of Jesus (from 2004 to 2016).

Early life and education 
Mary Clare Millea, a native of Connecticut, entered the Apostles of the Sacred Heart of Jesus in 1965. In 2009 she became the apostolic visitor for the Vatican to investigate American nuns.She has obtained a BS in Psychology at Seton Hill College (Greensburg, PA), M.S.Ed., a certificate of advanced graduate study in School Psychology at Duquesne University (Pittsburgh, PA), and a Doctorate in Canon Law at Lateran University (Rome).

Personal life 
Millea is fluent in English, Italian and Portuguese and has some understanding of French and Spanish.

Experience 
 Special Education Teacher
 School Psychologist
 School Principal
 Local superior and provincial superior in the United States Province
 Member of the General Council of Apostles of the Sacred Heart of Jesus in Rome, Italy for 18 years
 Elected Superior General of the Apostles of the Sacred Heart in 2004
 Observer for the XII Assembly of the Synod of Bishops on the Word of God in 2008

References

Year of birth missing (living people)
Living people
Seton Hill University alumni
Duquesne University alumni